Francis Arthur Clarence Finnigan (July 9, 1901 – December 25, 1991), nicknamed "The Shawville Express", was a Canadian ice hockey professional forward who played in the National Hockey League (NHL) from 1923 to 1937.  During this time, he played for the Ottawa Senators, Toronto Maple Leafs, and St. Louis Eagles, and was nicknamed the "Shawville Express." His younger brother Eddie Finnigan also played in the NHL. His daughter Joan Finnigan became a published writer. He was the last surviving member of the 1927 Stanley Cup champion Senators.

Personal life
Frank Finnigan was born in 1901 in Clarendon, Quebec, but grew up in Shawville, Quebec, a primarily anglophone town in the province of Quebec, located northwest of Ottawa along the Ottawa River. He retained a home in Shawville after becoming a professional hockey player. He married Maye Horner (1901–1992) and the couple had four children, Joan (1925–2007), Frank Jr., Norma and Ross. Finnigan suffered a heart attack on December 18, 1991, and he died on Christmas Day in 1991 in Shawville Hospital. He was survived by his wife and children and several grandchildren.

Playing career
Finnigan learned at an early age that there was money to be made in hockey. He received his first fee for playing hockey when he was 13, playing for Quyon against Fitzroy Harbour, for which he received $10. Finnigan first played senior-level hockey for the University of Ottawa in the Ottawa City Hockey League (OCHL) in nearby Ottawa in 1921–22. According to Finnigan, he was paid to play for the University and did not have to submit any assignments. As he had to take the train from Shawville to Ottawa, he picked up the nickname "Shawville Express." He played two more seasons for teams in the OCHL, with Ottawa Collegiate and Ottawa Montagnards before joining the Ottawa Senators in the 1923–24 season.

Finnigan was an integral member of the 1927 Stanley Cup champion Senators team, playing on a line with Hec Kilrea and Frank Nighbor. He later served as the Senators captain from 1930–1933, and scored a high of 21 goals in the 1929–30 season. When the Senators suspended operations for the 1931–32 NHL season, Finnigan played for the Toronto Maple Leafs, winning the Stanley Cup for a second time, returning to the Senators the following season. Finnigan scored the final Senators goal in the final season that the NHL Senators played in Ottawa. He scored an unassisted goal at the 1 minute, 7 second mark of the second period on March 15, 1934. The following season, he moved with the other Senators players to play for the transferred franchise in St. Louis, Missouri known as the St. Louis Eagles in the 1934-35 season. He was sold by the Eagles to the Maple Leafs before the season's end in February 1935 and he finished his career with several seasons with the Maple Leafs as a "defensive specialist."

Retirement
In 1937, Finnigan retired from the NHL. He returned to Ottawa and played ice hockey for various amateur teams, including the Ottawa RCAF Flyers while he was in the Air Force.

After retiring from professional hockey, Finnigan went into private business in the Ottawa area. He managed the Olde Colonial Hotel at the corner of O'Connor and Queen Streets in Ottawa. Finnigan sold his shares of the hotel and became head of sales for Brading's Brewery. It was while working at Brading's that Finnigan developed alcoholism and lost his job. He found a job in the federal government through Frank Ahearn, former owner of the Senators, and later Member of Parliament in Ottawa. During World War II, Finnigan joined the Canadian Air Force, and was a member for seven years. Finnigan then owned and managed the Merrickville Hotel in Merrickville, Ontario. Finnigan moved to Shawville and bought the Clarendon Hotel. Finnigan eventually overcame his problems with alcohol and sold the hotel and retired, remaining in the Shawville area.

The 'Bring Back The Senators' campaign
When the NHL planned to expand in 1989, the consortium to obtain a franchise for Ottawa signed Finnigan to be part of the 'Bring Back The Senators' campaign team. Finnigan along with his son Frank Jr., made public appearances on behalf of the campaign. Finnigan was also part of the presentation team to the NHL expansion committee in December 1990. The group was successful and the new Ottawa Senators team began play in the 1992–93 NHL season.

Finnigan died before the new team played its first game in 1992, for which he was scheduled to drop the puck for the ceremonial face-off. Instead, on opening night the honour went to his son, Frank Jr. to drop the puck. On that night, the team honoured him by retiring his #8 jersey, making him one of three players in NHL history to have his uniform retired by a team for which he never actually played. Finnigan's number was retired 55 years after he finished his NHL career - the longest wait for a player to have his number retired.

The street in front of the main entrance to the Ottawa Senators' arena, Canadian Tire Centre, is named Frank Finnigan Way in his honour. A banner honouring his retired number hangs from the rafters with Daniel Alfredsson's number 11, Chris Phillips’ number 4 and Chris Neil’s number 25.

At the time of his death, Finnigan was the last surviving member of the Senators Stanley Cup-winning team from the 1926–27 season, the final season of the original Ottawa Senators (1919–1927) dynasty and one of only a handful of players still alive from the NHL Senators' days. He was also the oldest living NHL player and appeared at various NHL functions.

Career statistics

Awards
1927 Stanley Cup Champion 

1932 Stanley Cup Champion 
 Played in NHL All-Star Game (1934).
This was the NHL's first all-star game, held as a benefit for Toronto player Ace Bailey. The first official NHL All-Star Game was held in 1947.

References

External links
 
 
 Legends Of Hockey page
 Sports Encyclopedia

1901 births
1991 deaths
Anglophone Quebec people
Canadian ice hockey right wingers
Canadian people of Irish descent
Ice hockey people from Quebec
National Hockey League players with retired numbers
Ottawa Senators (1917) players
Ottawa Senators (original) players
People from Outaouais
St. Louis Eagles players
Stanley Cup champions
Toronto Maple Leafs players
Canadian expatriate ice hockey players in the United States